The 1934 CCNY Beavers football team was an American football team that represented the City College of New York (CCNY) as an independent during the 1934 college football season. In their first season under Benny Friedman, the team compiled a 4–3 record.

Schedule

References

CCNY
CCNY Beavers football seasons
CCNY Beavers football